Fère-Champenoise is a commune in the Marne department in north-eastern France. It was the site of the Battle of Fère-Champenoise in March 1814.

Population

See also
Communes of the Marne department
Fershampenuaz, a village in Russia, named after the 1814 battle.

References

Ferechampenoise